Jon Douglas Finlayson (23 March 193812 September 2012) was an Australian stage and screen character actor, screenwriter, playwright, devisor, producer, director, singer, choreographer and costume designer and reconteur. He was known for his roles in the films Lonely Hearts (1982) and The Magic Show (1983).

He was also well-known from his numerous television roles, such as Colonel Archibald Spencer in Zoo Family (1985) and as James Gleeson in Snowy River: The McGregor Saga (1995–1996). He wrote sketches for The Mavis Bramston Show. He was noted for his hospitality as well as his 'Sunday Soirees' in the Melbourne show business community.

Early life 
Jon Finlayson was born in Coburg, Victoria to Clorine and Ron Finlayson. When he was about age 8 the family moved to Burwood where he attended Hartwell Primary School and Camberwell High School. His performing career began at about the same time when he toured Australia with the Australian Boys' Choir as a soprano.

Death 
Finlayson died of prostate cancer aged 74, on 12 September 2012 at St Vincent's Hospital, Melbourne

Filmography

References

External links

"Vale Jon Finlayson". tvtonight.com.au
"Jon Finlayson". rottentomatoes.com

1938 births
2012 deaths
Australian male film actors
Australian male stage actors
Australian male television actors
Australian television writers
Male actors from Melbourne
Australian male television writers